Eleuterio Santos Brito (9 November 1940 – 28 January 2008) was a Spanish footballer who played as a midfielder.

He spent the vast majority of his professional career with Real Zaragoza, appearing in 280 official games and scoring 96 goals.

Club career
Born in Santa Cruz de Tenerife, Canary Islands, Santos started playing with local CD Tenerife. In March 1963 he moved to Real Zaragoza, going on to spend nine of his ten seasons with the club in La Liga and being part of an attacking frontline dubbed Los Magníficos, which also featured Canário, Carlos Lapetra, Marcelino and Juan Manuel Villa.

International career
Santos earned one cap for Spain, playing the full 90 minutes in a 1–1 away friendly draw against Sweden on 2 May 1968.

Death
Santos died in his hometown on 28 January 2008 at age 67, after a long battle with illness.

References

External links

1940 births
2008 deaths
Spanish footballers
Footballers from Santa Cruz de Tenerife
Association football midfielders
La Liga players
Segunda División players
CD Tenerife players
Real Zaragoza players
CD Tudelano footballers
Spain international footballers